Statistics of the Chinese Jia-A League for the 1989 season.

Overview
It was contested by 8 teams, and China B won the championship.

League standings

References
China - List of final tables (RSSSF)

Chinese Jia-A League seasons
1
China
China
1989 establishments in China